The Haszard Point Range Front is one of two range lights, the front light and the rear light, on Prince Edward Island, Canada. They were built in 1889, and are still active.

See also
 List of lighthouses in Prince Edward Island
 List of lighthouses in Canada

References

External links
 Aids to Navigation Canadian Coast Guard

Lighthouses completed in 1889
Lighthouses in Prince Edward Island
Buildings and structures in Queens County, Prince Edward Island